The Podkumok is a river in Stavropol Krai, Russia, right tributary of the Kuma. The area of its basin is 2,220 km2 (857 mi2). The Podkumok originates in the Greater Caucasus.

It is widely used for irrigation. The biggest hydroelectric dam in Imperial Russia Water-powers , built in 1903, was located on the Podkumok near Yessentuki.

The towns of Kislovodsk, Yessentuki, Pyatigorsk, Georgiyevsk and urban-type settlements Goryachevodsky, Svobody are located on the Podkumok.

References

Rivers of Stavropol Krai